Vladimir Antonovich Dybo (born 30 April 1931) is a Soviet and Russian linguist, Doctor Nauk in Philological Sciences (1979), Professor (1992), Academician of the Russian Academy of Sciences (2011). A specialist in comparative historical linguistics and accentology, he is well-known as one of the founders of the Moscow School of Comparative Linguistics.

Biography
Dybo graduated from the Department of Russian language and Literature of the Faculty of History and Philology of State University of Gorky (1954) and postgraduate studies at the department of common and comparative linguistics of the Faculty of Philology of Moscow State University. Since 1958, he has been working at the Institute for Slavic Studies of the USSR Academy of Sciences (RAS): senior scientific and technical research fellow, junior research fellow, senior research fellow, leading research fellow; At present, he is the chief researcher at the Department of Slavic Linguistics.

In 1962, he received his candidate degree at the Institute of Slavic Studies on The problem of correlation of two Balto-Slavic series of accentual correspondences in a verb. In 1979, he received his doctoral degree on Experience in the reconstruction of the system of Proto-Slavic accent paradigms.

On May 26, 2000, he was elected a corresponding member of the Russian Academy of Sciences in the Department of Literature and Language (Linguistics). Since December 22, 2011 is full member (academician) of the Russian Academy of Sciences in the Department of Historical and Philological Sciences.

Positions
Dybo is director of the Center for Comparative Studies, Institute of Oriental Cultures and Antiquities, Russian State University for the Humanities; gives lectures Comparative grammar of Slavic languages (Proto-Slavic reconstruction); Slavic comparative historical accentology; Baltic comparative historical accentology; Typology and Genesis of paradigmatic accent systems. He directs postgraduates and doctoral students; under his leadership, 7 candidate dissertations and 2 doctoral dissertations were successfully defended.

He is the editor-in-chief of the Journal of Language Relationship, and a member of the Editorial Board of the journal Topics in the study of language. He is also a member of the Academic Council of the Russian State University for the Humanities and the Dissertation Council in the specialties comparative historical and typological linguistics and languages of Asia, Africa, the natives of Australia and America in the same place. Additionally, Dybo is a full member of the Russian Academy of Natural Sciences (1992).

Dybo is also the Chairman of the Moscow Linguistic Society, organizer of the Vladislav Illich-Svitych Nostratic Seminar.

He was awarded the medal In Commemoration of the 850th Anniversary of Moscow.

Scientific research

The author of about 200 scientific publications, including 7 monographs.

His main works are devoted to comparative historical grammar of Slavic, Baltic, Iranian, Indo-European and Nostratic languages, comparative historical accentology and historical typology of accent systems, accentology of Northwest Caucasian languages and Central Saharan languages, and Japanese. He made a significant contribution (along with Vladislav Illich-Svitych, Sergei Nikolaev, Andrey Zaliznyak) to the reconstruction of the ancient Balto-Slavic accent system.

Dybo developed the theory of distant kinship of languages and reconstruction of paleoculture based on language data. He is one of the most authoritative specialists in these fields in Russia and in the world. In particular, he built for the first time a coherent and coherent concept of Slavic comparative historical accentology, as well as a typology of paradigmatic accent systems.

He manages a number of projects under grants from the Russian Foundation for Basic Research and Russian Humanitarian Science Foundation, and coordinates the work on the collective work Fundamentals of Slavic accentology under the program of fundamental research of the Department of Historical and Philological Sciences of the Russian Academy of Sciences

Family
His wife, Valeria Churganova (1931–1998), and daughter, Anna Dybo (born 1959), are also well-known linguists.

See also
 Dybo's law

Further reading
 Dybo, V.A. (2002) "Balto-Slavic accentology and Winter's Law"
 Yakubovich, I. (1998) Nostratic studies in Russia

References

Notes

Bibliography
 

Linguists from Russia
Linguists from the Soviet Union
20th-century linguists
1931 births
Living people
Slavists
Paleolinguists
Linguists of Nostratic languages
Full Members of the Russian Academy of Sciences
Long-range comparative linguists
Moscow School of Comparative Linguistics